Julian Henry Lowenfeld (born June 7, 1963) is an American-Russian poet, playwright, trial lawyer, composer, and prize-winning translator, best known for his translations of Alexander Pushkin's poetry into English.

Life  
Lowenfeld was born in Washington, D.C. to Andreas Lowenfeld, a German-Jewish Professor of International Law (NYU), and Elena Lowenfeld, a Cuban guitar player and art critic.

His great-grandfather Rafael Löwenfeld, a correspondent for the newspaper Berliner Tagesblatt in St. Petersburg, was the first translator of Leo Tolstoy into German, and Tolstoy's play The Power of Darkness had its world premiere in the Schiller Theater, Berlin, which Löwenfeld founded. After the Russian revolution, the Nabokov family lived in the Löwenfeld home in Berlin.

Lowenfeld studied Russian literature at Harvard, did postgraduate work at St. Petersburg University and then obtained his J.D. degree at New York University. As a trial lawyer, Lowenfeld won several multimillion-dollar judgments on behalf of major Russian film studios Mosfilm, Lenfilm, and Soyuzmultfilm Studios and their licensees against copyright pirates in the USA.

Lowenfeld translates from 8 languages, including Russian, German, Spanish, French, Italian and Latin. He has translated verses of Lermontov, Blok, Mandelshtam, Tsvetaeva, Akhmatova, Yesenin, Mayakovsky, Rilke, Goethe, Heine, Pessoa, Lorca, Machado, Martí, Neruda, Leopardi, Petrarch, Dante, Catullus, Ovid, Martial, and Horace.

Lowenfeld's translations of Alexander Pushkin received overall positive reviews and considered to be 'the most brilliant and fullest translation' of Pushkin's works because Lowenfeld succeeded in preserving original and distinctive rhythms of most poems so one can easily recognise which poem this is without any knowledge of English:Я вас любил: любовь еще, быть может,            I loved you once, and still, perhaps, love’s yearningВ душе моей угасла не совсем;                          Within my soul has not quite burned away.Но пусть она вас больше не тревожит;             Yet may that nevermore you be concerning;Я не хочу печалить вас ничем.                           I would not wish you sad in any way.Original: Alexander Pushkin                                   Translation: Julian Henry Lowenfeld

Pushkin's Little Tragedies, translated into verse by Lowenfeld, were staged at the Baryshnikov Arts Center in New York in 2009.

Performances
Lowenfeld has recited, in both Russian and English, at theatrical and musical productions around the world.

Awards
In 2007 Lowenfeld translated the video collection Animated Soviet Propaganda (4 DVDs), which won the New York Times' "Critics' Choice" Award.

Lowenfeld's dual language compilation titled My Talisman: The Poetry & Life of Alexander Pushkin earned him the prestigious Russian art and literature ‘Petropol’ prize in 2010.

In 2012 his translation of the Russian bestseller Everyday Saints and Other Stories won first prize at New York's Read Russia 2012 Festival. Over a million books were printed and over 3 million digital copies sold worldwide by 2012.

For his "outstanding literary translations and dedicated efforts to popularize Russian culture in the English language" Lowenfeld was awarded the Friendship and Cooperation Medal from the Russian Federal Agency Rossotrudnichestvo in 2013.

Religious beliefs  
In year 2012 Julian Henry Lowenfeld was baptized into Christian Orthodox faith in Moscow's Sretensky Monastery.

References

1963 births
Living people
Lawyers from Washington, D.C.
American male poets
Russian male poets
21st-century American poets
American composers
21st-century American composers
American translators
20th-century American dramatists and playwrights
Harvard University alumni
New York University School of Law alumni
American expatriates in Russia
Saint Petersburg State University alumni
American emigrants to Russia
Naturalised citizens of Russia
American people of German-Jewish descent
American people of Cuban descent
Russian people of German-Jewish descent
Russian people of Cuban descent
21st-century American male writers